Hatice Bahar Özgüvenç (born 10 June 1984) is a Turkish  female football manager and former women's football player. She coaches Fatih Karagümrük. She was a member of the Turkish national team.

Özgüvenç serves as teacher for physical education in a primary school in Muratlı town of Tekirdağ Province.

Playing career

Club

Hatice Bahar Özgüvenç obtained her license for Feriköyspor on 23 October 1997. She has been playing in the Turkish Women's First League since 1999, and for Ataşehir Belediyespor since the 2013–14 season.

At the end of the 1999–2000 season, she enjoyed league championship with her club Delta Mabilyaspor. She played for Kuzeyspor (2001–02), Marmara Üniversitesi Spor (2006–07), Zeytinburnuspor (2007–08), Maltepe Yalıspor (2008–09), Lüleburgaz 39 Spor (2009–2013) and Ataşehir Belediyespor (2013–2017). After the 2016–17 First League season, she retired from active football playing at the age of 32.

International
On 20 November 2006 she scored the only goal for Turkey in the UEFA Euro 2009 qualifying – Group A1 match against Croatia. In the UEFA Support International Tournament group qualifying matches in November 2007, she netted a goal against the Bulgarian, and two goals against the Azeri women's team.

Özgüvenç took part in a special friendly football game of mixed gender held on 17 May 2011 in the BJK İnönü Stadium, Istanbul that was played  on the "World Hypertension Day" in order to increase the awareness of hypertension.
.

Playing career statistics
.

Managerial career
By September 2020, Özgüvenç was appointed manager of the Beşiktaş J.K. In the 2020–21 Turkcell League season, her team won the champion title after defeating Fatih Vatan Spor in the play-off final match.

By October 2021, Özgüvenç was appointed as a manager of the newly established team in Fatih Karagümrük.

Managerial career statistics
.

Honours

Player
 Turkish Women's First Football League
 Delta Mabilyaspor
 Winners (1): 1999–2000

 Ataşehir Belediyespor
 Runners-up (3): 2013–14, 2014–15, 2015–16
 Third places (1): 2016–17

Manager
 Turkish Women's First Football League
 Beşiktaş J.K.
 Winners (1): 2020–21
 Fatih Karagümrük SK
Runners up (1): 2021-22

References

External links

Living people
1984 births
People from Bakırköy
Footballers from Istanbul
Turkish women's footballers
Women's association football forwards
Turkish schoolteachers
Turkey women's international footballers
Lüleburgaz 39 Spor players
Marmara Üniversitesi Spor players
Ataşehir Belediyespor players
Turkish women's football managers
Turkish female association football managers
Beşiktaş J.K. (women's football) managers
21st-century Turkish sportswomen